Jennifer Mason  (b. 1958) is a British sociologist and Professor Emerita of Sociology at the University of Manchester.

Biography
Mason studied for her undergraduate degree in sociology at the University of Southampton and a PhD at the University of Kent. She worked as a lecturer at Lancaster University before being appointed Reader in Sociology at the University of Leeds. In 2005 she moved to the University of Manchester and co-founded The Morgan Centre for Research into Everyday Lives with Carol Smart. Mason has served as the Vice-Chair of the Economic and Social Research Council's research committee and acted as Chair of the ESRC Grants Delivery Group from 2012 to 2015.  She was elected as a fellow of the British Academy in 2019.

Select publications
Mason, J. 2017. Affinities: Potent Connections in Personal Life, Polity.
Mason, J. 2017 Qualitative Researching (third edition). SAGE. 
Mason, J. (ed). 2016. Living the Weather: Voices from the Calder Valley. University of Manchester.
Mason, J. and Dale, A. 2010. Understanding Social Research: Thinking Creatively about Method. SAGE.

References

1958 births
Fellows of the British Academy
Academics of the University of Manchester
Alumni of the University of Kent
Alumni of the University of Southampton
Living people
British sociologists
British women sociologists